The Ruaha lampeye (Lacustricola omoculatus) is a species of poeciliid fish. It is endemic to Tanzania where it is only known to occur at its type locality in the Great Ruaha River drainage. Its natural habitats are swampy areas with out-flowing creeks. This species grows to a length of  TL.  It is also found in the aquarium trade.

References 

Ruaha lampeye
Endemic freshwater fish of Tanzania
Ruaha lampeye
Taxonomy articles created by Polbot
Taxobox binomials not recognized by IUCN